Margaret Muriel de Melfort Martin-Harvey (4 October 1891, in London – 15 December 1988, in Hillingdon, London) was an English stage actress.

Martin-Harvey was born to actors, London-born Angelita Helena Margarita (née de Silva) and Essex-born Sir John Martin-Harvey. She made her debut in 1921 in The Bear Leadera, and later toured the United States and Australia. She also played the leading role in two silent films. Her brother was the actor Michael Martin-Harvey.

Martin-Harvey married three times. She first married Ronald Squire in August 1924; they divorced the same year. On 15 July 1926, she married actor Garry Marsh, an actor 11 years her junior. She later married Anthony Huntly-Gordon, who was the company and stage manager to the Agatha Christie thriller The Mousetrap at the Ambassadors Theatre for 21 years.

Filmography
 The Answer (1916)
 The Hard Way (1916)

References

External links

 

1891 births
1988 deaths
20th-century English actresses
Actresses from London
British actors of Latin American descent
English film actresses
English people of Chilean descent
English silent film actresses
English stage actresses